The 1959 Ole Miss Rebels football team represented the University of Mississippi during the 1959 NCAA University Division football season. Ole Miss finished the season with an overall record of ten wins and one loss (10–1), tied for second in the Southeastern Conference (SEC) and with a victory over LSU in the Sugar Bowl. The team gave up only 21 points all season, and were retroactively named national champions by Berryman, Billingsley, Dunkel and Sagarin (however, it is not recognized by the NCAA). Syracuse was crowned as the national champion by both the AP and the UPI wire services. The team was later rated the third best squad from 1956 to 1995 by Sagarin.

Schedule

Roster
QB Bobby Franklin
E Johnny Brewer
G/PK Robert Khayat
DB Billy Brewer
HB Cowboy Woodruff

References

Ole Miss
Ole Miss Rebels football seasons
College football national champions
Sugar Bowl champion seasons
Ole Miss Rebels football